AFP: American Fighter Pilot is a reality series broadcast briefly on CBS in 2002.  It followed three United States Air Force officers as they trained to become pilots of F-15 fighter jets at Tyndall Air Force Base outside of Panama City, Florida.  The series included footage of their experiences in the air, as well as interactions with their families and instructors.  Directors Tony Scott and Ridley Scott were co-executive producers.  Unsuccessful in the ratings, the series was cancelled after two episodes.

Media information
The full series of seven episodes (including five unaired episodes) was released on DVD in 2005 by Hannover House.

References

External links

CBS original programming
Documentary television series about aviation
2000s American reality television series
2002 American television series debuts
2002 American television series endings
Television series about the United States Air Force